The qualifications for the 1992 AFC U-16 Championship.

Groups

Group 1

Group 2

Group 3

Group 4
Within Group 4 there was planned to be a preliminary group for the following teams: Hong Kong, Macau, Taiwan, Philippines, Vietnam, Guam. The winner would advance to Group 4 proper. However, no results of this are known and it seems most/all teams later withdrew.

Group 5

Qualified teams

 (host)

External links
RSSSF

Qual
1992